SBS TV is a South Korean very first commercial free-to-air terrestrial television channel based in Seoul Capital Area operated by Seoul Broadcasting System. The channel was launched on 9 December 1991.

History 
SBS TV is South Korea's very first commercial television station based in Seoul Capital Area and it was established on 9 December 1991, when the government allowed the creation of a second commercial station in Seoul. On that day at 10:00am, SBS was official opening ceremony with the introduction of SBS TV marked in conjunction with MBC celebrated its 30th anniversary based in Seoul, and it was designated as "The Day of Birth of SBS", as it broadcast by MBC on the program MBC Newsdesk. On the same day, SBS Eight O'Clock News was launched as the network's newscast. Initially, SBS were only broadcasting terrestrially in Seoul and its surrounding areas and broadcasts from Seoul. This broadcast area was only limited to Seoul Capital Area (the surrounding areas Seoul, capital of South Korea) only and broadcasts in Seoul. On 9 October 1992, the government began accepting applications for private broadcasting stations in other regions of the country. SBS had planned for a television and radio broadcast affiliate network that aims to air SBS' programs in other new regional channels before its 5th anniversary. In 1994, the private channels KNN in Busan, TJB in Daejeon, TBC in Daegu, and kbc in Gwangju were created after government approval. On 14 May 1995, SBS launched its national television network with its new local affiliates, KNN, TJB, TBC, and kbc. SBS had managed a network that airs SBS programs in other regional channels while local stations created local programming to suit the local residents needs.

Programming

SBS network

Controversies

SBS Eight O'Clock News Jang Ja-yeon letter case misreporting 

SBS Eight O'Clock News, the network's flagship newscast, reported “Actress Jang Ja-yeon had ‘entertained’ 31 guests for a total of 100 times.” The newscast also showed a 230-page document directly written by Jang which however was not her writing. the newscast said "A 50-container/230-page document directly written and delivered to friends by Jang Ja-yeon, who committed suicide in March 2009, has been obtained. In the document, a narrative titled ‘Snow’ draws the story of how unknown celebrities are forced into an ugly entertainment industry." The newscast cited the documents, stating, "The police who were investigating Jang Ja-yeon's case knew of this fact but chose to overlook it. Jang Ja-yeon asked for ‘revenge’ in the document." They added, "Jang Ja-yeon entertained a total of 31 people, 100 times – being forced to give sexual favors. However, claims by representative Kim from her past agency reveals a completely different story. Jang Ja-yeon had kept records of their jobs however, and within these records, it is supposed that officials, publisher officials, corporations, financial institutions, and media officials are involved." Also, "A handwriting expert has confirmed that the documents belonged to Jang Ja-yeon."

The newscast revealed, "Jang Ja-yeon wrote, ‘Please get revenge. There is no way out of hosting. The men who come to receive services are evil. I was forced to host over 100 times. Whenever I get new clothes to wear, I had to meet another devil. Not just in Kangnam, but I also hosted at Suwon Karaoke and various room salons. Even on my parents’ memorial day, I was forced to host. Since I made a list, avenge me to the death. Even if I die, I will take my revenge to the grave.’". however the National Institute of Scientific Investigation said that the letters were fabricated. They said:"In these letters, the way that certain characters like ‘yo’ and ‘ya’ were written coincide directly with the writing habits of the late actress Jang Ja-yeon. The way the consonants and vowels were written are exactly alike, proving that these letters were written by the same person." SBS further added, "It is virtually impossible for Jun to have perfected the handwriting of Jang Ja-yeon by copying the picture of her suicide note from a newspaper. He could not have written 230 letters in her copied handwriting with such limited information, and it is also unlikely that three years worth of letters were merely the result of a concocted plan." SBS continued, "The letters also reveal detailed information regarding her agency's advancement plans, as well as information on the figures she ‘hosted’ that others would not be able to know. If anything, the letters and envelopes show that Jun tried his best to make sure that Jang Ja-yeon's identity was not leaked through the letters.".

However the National Forensic Service confirms that Jang Ja-yeon's letters were fabricated. Yang Hoo-yeol the chief of the NFS opened an official briefing with the media and reported, "After comparing Jang Ja-yeon's original handwriting to Jun's handwriting and the letters in question, results have shown that the letters are not in line with Jang Ja-yeon's original handwriting. Many of grammatical errors are in line with the mistakes Jun made in his personal letters, so we believe that Jang Ja-yeon's letters were fabricated by Jun." He concluded, "The letters that Jun claimed were sent to him by Jang Ja Yeon have a completely different handwriting style to Jang Ja Yeon's original handwriting. Jang Ja Yeon did not write these letters.".

SBS responded to the reports made by the National Forensic Service yesterday, in which they asserted that Jang Ja-yeon's letters were indeed fabricated. SBS stated, "We have no option but to accept the results declared by the NSF. We felt that we had gone through all of the correct measures in investigating the letters for our reports, so we are apologetic for reporting something that was not revealed to be the truth." The station went on to explain their process for their findings. "We made a detailed comparison of the court records and the content of the letters and decided that the possibility of Jang Ja-yeon having written the letters herself was high. We did not, however, investigate the documents at the time." SBS continued, "When we commissioned a handwriting analysis, results showed that it belonged to Jang. We had met with Jun, the owner of the letters, twice already, and even met with his family. His family revealed that they had not directly confirmed that the celebrity Jun knew was Jang Ja-yeon, just that he had a celebrity friend. We then decided that it would be impossible for an inmate to accurately record the whereabouts of someone else outside for over three years." "As it stands, we have no option but to accept the results of the NFS."

The 8 News concluded with an apology to the viewers. "We are extremely apologetic towards the viewers for adding confusion, and to the bereaved for causing distress. We will be continuing to work to find the truth behind Jang Ja-yeon's controversy.".

Wardrobe malfunction scandal 
A wardrobe malfunction occurred during the January 29, 2012 episode of Inkigayo in which Ryu Hwa-young accidentally exposed her breast during her dance solo. A screencap made its rounds online through Korean media portals and SNS services. JoongAng Ilbo said that the show was airing live when the incident occurred. Core Contents Media issued an official statement about the nipslip: “T-ara's stage was done completely live, and it was a live broadcast accident. There weren't any problems during their rehearsal [...]. Before the fact that she's a celebrity, she's still a minor, so we hope that people will remember that she's a young girl.” SBS issued an apology statement.

Mini-skirt controversy
SBS 8 News also got into the fire for airing close-up footage of a girl's thighs with the upper part covered by a mini-skirt. It was a part of a news report about women wearing mini-skirts that might cause rape. However, netizens criticised the footage as: sexual assault, and a mini-skirt, what is the relationship, and SBS 8 o'clock news close-up footage of miniskirts, women are walking to the scene, it is only part of her thighs.

Woman sues SBS for showing her breasts
A female whose breasts were exposed on SBS  Wide eNews 840 (aired after SBS 8 News) is suing SBS and CJ E&M Media for compensation damages. According to the Seoul Central District Court on the 14th of September 2010, they stated: "A teacher working at a university in Seoul by the name of Kim claims she has suffered damage from a scene where her breasts were exposed, and has filed in a lawsuit against SBS and CJ Media for damage compensation." Kim stated, "SBS filmed me at a proximity where people can recognize my identity. I had to suffer because of their negligence in editing. tvN and its owners, CJ (E&M) Media, showed an unnecessary scene in a corner of the ‘most watched news program’ which stimulated sexual suggestions." She continued, "Because of this incident I suffered from acute laryngitis, and I demand 100 million won ($86,000 USD) for medical expenses and damage compensation." On 31 July 2010, the scene of Kim-ssi's exposed breasts during summer vacation was shown. Viewers who saw this complained, to which SBS responded by immediately deleting the scene and stated, "There was a mistake with processing and editing broadcasts at KNN."

2008 Summer Olympics opening ceremony broadcast controversy

On 30 July 2008, SBS gave out a programme to show a full-time rehearsal of the Beijing Olympic opening ceremony before it could be legally watched on 8 August 2008. In this programme, the rehearsal was clearly illustrated, including the show, the organization, and the torch. Some of the sections had been uploaded to YouTube, which therefore made them available to all over the world. Though YouTube later removed the videos, SBS was still blamed for copyright infringement, and some people and groups were even threatening to seek compensation from the company for infringing the broadcasting rights of the IOC.

Korean Blues
On May 9, 1993, the current affairs program Unanswered Questions aired an expose story that has had a profound and lasting effect on the diamond jewellery industry. Prior to 1993, Korean retailers and consumers exhibited a preference and paid a premium for blue fluorescent diamonds. However, the TV program accused local Korean grading laboratories of over-grading the colour of fluorescent diamonds, suggesting “your D is really E”. Korean traders replaced many of the fluorescent diamonds they had sold earlier, becoming net sellers of fluorescent goods and buyers of non-fluorescent diamonds. This simultaneous demand and dumping of diamonds on the world market, the Rapaport Diamond Report price guide to add a chart with price guides for blue fluorescent diamonds of different colours and clarities. Since newly wealthy Korean industrialists saw diamonds as an investment, many of those diamonds were high color and clarity. This set the tone for Price Indications for Blue Fluorescence Diamonds. This guide became a self-fulfilling prophecy and is still in place today. It has had some downs and ups, however since the Internet has played a larger role in ‘educating’ consumers, the discounts on the price guide have steadily grown fourfold.

See also 
 MBC Standard FM
 Channel A

References

External links 
 SBS TV schedule 

 
Television networks in South Korea
Korean-language television stations
Television channels in South Korea
Mass media companies of South Korea
Television channels and stations established in 1991
Mass media in Seoul
1991 establishments in South Korea
Seoul Broadcasting System television networks